Héctor Enrique Gutiérrez (born August 29, 1986, in Toluca) is a former Mexican professional footballer. He last played as a midfielder for Potros UAEM.

Career
Gutiérrez began playing football in Cruz Azul's youth system. He made his Primera Division debut in 2008, but found limited opportunities to play for the first team due to the performances of Gerardo Torrado, Christian Riveros and Benjamín Galindo.

References

External links
 
 

1986 births
Living people
Footballers from the State of Mexico
Liga MX players
Cruz Azul footballers
Association football midfielders
Mexican footballers